"Krata Ta Matia Sou Klista" (Greek: Κράτα τα ματια σου κλειστα; English: Keep your eyes closed) is the first single by the Greek Cypriot singer Ivi Adamou from her second album San Ena Oniro, written and produced by Melisses. It was released on 23 April 2011.

Track listing
Digital download
"Krata Ta Matia Sou Klista" – 3:38

Credits and personnel
 Lead vocals – Ivi Adamou, Melisses
 Producers – Melisses
 Lyrics – Melisses
 Label: Sony Music Greece/Day 1

Music video
Three teasers were released for the video clip. The official video clip was published on 23 April 2011. The video was blocked worldwide and was later re-uploaded in MelissesVEVO.

Charts

Release history

References 

2011 singles
Ivi Adamou songs
2011 songs